The Mission Bell is the sixth studio album by Delirious?. It was released in the UK on 7 November 2005 and in the US on 27 December 2005.

Singles

On 10 October 2005, Delirious? released "Paint the Town Red" as a single. It entered the UK Singles Charts at No. 56.

On 22 January 2006, "Our God Reigns" debuted at No. 1 on the UK Cross Rhythms radio chart. It stayed at the top for another week before dropping to Nos. 2 and 5, finally falling out of the top ten altogether.

On 16 April 2006, "Here I Am Send Me" debuted at No. 1 on the UK Cross Rhythms radio chart. It remained at No. 1 for four weeks before dropping to No. 2, then out of the charts completely.

Track listing

Personnel 
Delirious?
 Martin Smith – vocals, guitars 
 Stu Garrard – guitars, vocals 
 Tim Jupp – keyboards 
 Jon Thatcher – bass
 Stewart Smith – drums, percussion

Additional musicians
 Stephen Mason – pedal steel guitar (12)
 Tim Harries – string arrangements 
 Gerard LeFeurve – cello 
 Nick Evans-Pughe – violin 
 Steve Morris – violin
 TobyMac – hymn preach (3)
 Faye Simpson – backing vocals (9)
 A Skillz – sound bites (9)
 Moya Brennon – backing vocals (12)

Production 
 Martin Smith – producer 
 Stu Garrard – producer 
 Sam Gibson – producer, recording, mixing 
 Chris Blair – mastering at Abbey Road Studios (London, UK)
 Mark Debnam – creative director, design 
 Stewart Smith – creative director, design 
 Jimmy Abegg – photography 
 Joshua Dunford – photography

References 

Delirious? albums
2005 albums
Sparrow Records albums